Dugny is a commune in the northeastern suburbs of Paris, France.

About a third of Le Bourget airport lies on the territory of the commune of Dugny, including its main terminal and the Musée de l'Air et de l'Espace (air and space museum). Nonetheless, the airport was named after the neighbouring commune of Le Bourget.

Population

Heraldry

Transport
Dugny is served by no station of the Paris Métro, RER, or suburban rail network. The closest station to Dugny is Le Bourget station on Paris RER line B. This station is located in the neighbouring commune of Le Bourget,  from the town centre of Dugny.
Le Bourget Airport  and Charles de Gaulle International Airport is located near Dugny.

Education
Schools in Dugny:
Three public preschools (écoles maternelles): Marcel Cachin, Irene et Frédéric Joliot-Curie, and Nelson Mandela
Four public elementary schools: Colonel Fabien, Jean Jaurès, Paul Langevin, and Henri Wallon
One public junior high school: Collège Jean-Baptiste Clément
Two senior high schools: Lycée hôtelier polyvalent Rabelais (public) and Lycée Privé Robert Schuman (private)

The Médiathèque Anne Frank is on the first floor (not the ground floor) of the Espace Victor Hugo.

See also
Communes of the Seine-Saint-Denis department

References

External links

Website of Dugny 

Communes of Seine-Saint-Denis